Chorispora tenella is a species of flowering plant in the mustard family known by several common names, including purple mustard, blue mustard, musk mustard, and crossflower. This mustard is native to parts of Eurasia but is well known in other parts of the world, particularly in temperate regions, as an introduced species and a noxious weed.

Description

This is an annual herb reaching a maximum of half a meter in height. It has wavy-edged alternate leaves of lanceolate or oblanceolate shape of up to 8 centimeters long, and glandular hairs are typically observed on most parts of the plant. The four tiny petals of each cruciform flower emerge from a loose tube of sepals and spread into a corolla about a centimeter wide. The flowers are lavender to pale magenta in color, and a field heavily infested with purple mustard can take on a distinct lavender wash. The flowers have a light scent—more noticeable when many individual plants are blooming together in a large area—which is considered unpleasant by some and fragrant by others. The fruits are long upturned cylindrical capsules about 4 centimeters long containing round, reddish-brown seeds that eventually burst from the fruit pods.

Etymology of name
According to the Rocky Mountain Biological Laboratory, the word origin of the scientific name for this species is as follows:

Invasiveness
This is a tenacious weed which can be troublesome in agriculture. It reduces yields in grain fields and when it is consumed by dairy cattle it gives their milk a bad taste and odor. This plant reproduces by seed, so any control method preventing the plants from setting seed is effective.

Outside of its native range, this species commonly occurs in areas where the soil has been disturbed, as well as along roadways, in pastures, and in steppe habitats.

References

External links

Jepson Manual Treatment
USDA Plants Profile
EncycloWeedia Entry
Photo gallery

Brassicaceae